Only the Family, often abbreviated as OTF, is a rap collective from Chicago, Illinois. The group was formed by rapper Lil Durk in 2010.  The group is home to recording artists including the late rapper King Von.

Record label
The OTF label was part of French Montana's Coke Boys, and as a result, adopted the nickname 'OTF Coke Boys'. This saw OTF members feature on the subsequent Coke Boys album. The label has since grown to be independent from the Coke Boys imprint and is nowadays cooperating with Empire Distribution, except for Lil Durk, who signed to Alamo Records and Interscope Records in 2018 (after being released from his Def Jam Recordings Contract); his releases for Alamo are nowadays distributed by Sony Music after the latter acquired the label in June 2021.

Discography

Compilation albums

Singles

Other charted songs

References

American hip hop groups
Hip hop collectives
Musical groups from Chicago
Underground hip hop groups
Drill musicians
Musical groups established in 2011
2011 establishments in Illinois

https://hiphopdx.com/news/id.66502/title.otf-aroy-shot-killed-on-chicagos-oblock-murder-caught-on-film